Bavan-e Olya (also Romanized as Bavān-e ‘Olyā; also known as Bavān-e Bālā and Bovān Bālā) is a village in Bakesh-e Yek Rural District, in the Central District of Mamasani County, Fars Province, Iran. At the 2006 census, its population was 54, in 14 families.

References 

Populated places in Mamasani County